Mark Nicoski (born 24 November 1983) is a former Australian rules footballer who previously played with the West Coast Eagles in the Australian Football League (AFL). In 2006, Nicoski fractured an ankle midway through the season, and thus missed out on playing in the club's premiership victory. Over the next seasons, shoulder and groin injuries restricted his time on the field, but in 2011 he took up a different role in the team, kicking 41 goals playing as a forward. Nicoski also represented Australia in the 2011 International Rules Series. However, after serious injuries, including a torn hamstring during the final of the 2012 pre-season tournament, he did not play at AFL level over the following two seasons. Having played 112 games for West Coast, Nicoski retired from the AFL at the end of the 2013 season.

Football career
The son of Don and Karen Nicoski, Nicoski has Macedonian heritage on his father's side and Croatian heritage on his mother's side. Nicoski attended Carine Senior High School, where he played for the school's football team, as well as the Carine Junior Football Club.

Nicoski was recruited by the West Coast Eagles with pick number 25 in the 2003 Rookie Draft. He shared the 2003 WAFL Rookie of the Year Award with Zach Beeck, and was promoted to West Coast's senior list for the 2004 season. After spending the first four rounds in the WAFL, Nicoski made his debut for West Coast against  in round five of the 2004 season, recording 16 disposals. He played a further 10 consecutive games, as a rebounding defender or on the wing, before injuring his shoulder in round 15 against . He returned for one WAFL game in round 21, but did not play any further AFL games. Nicoski played for Subiaco for the first two rounds of the 2005 season, before being selected in the Eagles' team for round two against . He spent 11 weeks on the sidelines, with Subiaco granted special dispensation from the WAFL to allow him to play for the club in the 2006 WAFL Grand Final in an attempt to prove his fitness for the 2006 AFL Grand Final. Nicoski played in Subiaco's premiership win over  but was not selected to play in West Coast's premiership-winning team.

In an intra-club practice match during the 2006–07 off-season, Nicoski severely dislocated his shoulder, forcing him to miss the first half of the 2007 season. He returned in round 12 against , but re-injured his shoulder in the next game against . He returned to the side in round 22, playing the last three games of the season before returning to Subiaco, where he again played in a premiership. Nicoski played 19 of 22 games in the 2008 season, but was not at his best, and was dropped twice, although he still managed to finish seventh in West Coast's Club Champion Award. He played 13 of the club's first 15 games in 2009, before a groin injury forced him to miss the rest of the season. He returned in round one of the 2010 season, and was switched to a role as a defensive forward, but struggled for form due to his shoulder. He played six games before opting to end his season after round 12 for surgery. He spent the rest of the season as a mentor to other small forwards Gerrick Weedon, Ryan Neates and Lewis Broome, and was awarded the Chris Mainwaring Medal as the Best Clubman at the Eagles' 2010 Club Champion Awards.

Nicoski returned to the Eagles' side in the 2011 season in a new role as a small forward. He played every game for the club, kicking 41 goals in 25 games. Nicoski's form was described as a factor in West Coast's turnaround from last place to fourth place over the season, with assistant coach Peter Sumich nominating him as "the most improved player on our list" and a "brand new footballer". He played his 100th game for the club against  in round 14, finishing the season behind Josh Kennedy (59 goals) and Mark LeCras (47 goals) in West Coast's goalkicking. His six goals in the round 20 match against  was a career-best. During the 2012 pre-season, Nicoski tore a tendon in his hamstring during the grand final of the 2012 NAB Cup against . Initially predicted to miss twelve weeks, he suffered complications after his original surgery which led to a further round of surgery, and was ruled out for the remainder of the season in July 2012. Under new rules introduced by the AFL from the end of the 2012 season onwards, Nicoski was for a time listed as an unrestricted free agent, but signed a one-year extension to his contract with West Coast in October 2012. Due to further complications with his hamstring, he did not play during the early 2013 season, and he was placed on the club's long-term injury list in March 2013, with Callum Sinclair elevated to the senior list in his place.

Having not played for 14 months, Nicoski returned to football in May 2013, playing for Subiaco's reserves team. In a WAFL game the following month, Nicoski was again injured when an opposition landed heavily on his wrist, necessitated season-ending surgery. With his contract expiring at the season, he chose to retire from the AFL, although it is unclear whether he will continue playing for Subiaco. He and teammate Adam Selwood retired on the same day, having been recruited to West Coast at the same time.

Personal life
Nicoski serves as an ambassador for the Samaritans Crisis Line, a crisis hotline. He is currently managed by Corporate Sports Australia. Beginning in October 2011, Nicoski has been an occasional presenter on Greenfingers, an Australian gardening show broadcast on the Seven Network.

Statistics
 Statistics correct as of 15 August 2013.

|- style="background-color: #EAEAEA"
! scope="row" style="text-align:center" | 2004
|  || 31 || 11 || 1 || 1 || 74 || 49 || 123 || 28 || 21 || 0.1 || 0.1 || 6.7 || 4.5 || 11.2 || 2.5 || 1.9
|-
! scope="row" style="text-align:center" | 2005
|  || 31 || 21 || 12 || 7 || 202 || 120 || 322 || 100 || 38 || 0.6 || 0.3 || 9.6 || 5.7 || 15.3 || 4.8 || 1.8
|- style="background-color: #EAEAEA"
! scope="row" style="text-align:center" | 2006
|  || 31 || 12 || 5 || 3 || 146 || 76 || 222 || 49 || 21 || 0.4 || 0.3 || 12.2 || 6.3 || 18.5 || 4.1 || 1.8
|-
! scope="row" style="text-align:center" | 2007
|  || 6 || 5 || 0 || 1 || 41 || 32 || 73 || 24 || 4 || 0.0 || 0.2 || 6.8 || 5.3 || 12.2 || 4.0 || 0.7
|- style="background-color: #EAEAEA"
! scope="row" style="text-align:center" | 2008
|  || 6 || 19 || 2 || 3 || 185 || 124 || 309 || 78 || 31 || 0.1 || 0.2 || 9.8 || 6.5 || 16.3 || 4.1 || 1.6
|-
! scope="row" style="text-align:center" | 2009
|  || 6 || 13 || 0 || 3 || 112 || 80 || 192 || 34 || 21 || 0.0 || 0.2 || 8.6 || 6.2 || 14.8 || 2.6 || 1.6
|- style="background-color: #EAEAEA"
! scope="row" style="text-align:center" | 2010
|  || 6 || 6 || 0 || 4 || 33 || 32 || 65 || 26 || 11 || 0.0 || 0.7 || 5.5 || 5.3 || 10.8 || 4.3 || 1.8
|-
! scope="row" style="text-align:center" | 2011
|  || 6 || 25 || 41 || 25 || 214 || 105 || 319 || 72 || 70 || 1.6 || 1.0 || 8.6 || 4.2 || 12.8 || 2.9 || 2.8
|- class="sortbottom"
! colspan=3| Career
! 112
! 61
! 47
! 1007
! 618
! 1625
! 411
! 217
! 0.5
! 0.4
! 9.0
! 5.5
! 14.5
! 3.7
! 1.9
|}

References

External links

West Coast Eagles players
1983 births
Living people
Australian people of Croatian descent
Australian people of Macedonian descent
Australian rules footballers from Perth, Western Australia
People educated at Carine Senior High School
Sportsmen from Western Australia
Subiaco Football Club players
Australia international rules football team players